The slender codling or slender cod (Halargyreus johnsonii) is a morid cod, the only species in the genus Halargyreus. First discovered by and named after James Yate Johnson.

References
 
 Tony Ayling & Geoffrey Cox, Collins Guide to the Sea Fishes of New Zealand,  (William Collins Publishers Ltd, Auckland, New Zealand 1982) 

slender codling
Fish of the North Atlantic
Yellow Sea
slender codling
slender codling